Manuel Rivero (November 3, 1908 – August 23, 2001), nicknamed "The Golden Flash", was an American football, basketball, and baseball player and coach.

A native of Havana, Cuba, Rivero was a three-year football lettermen at Columbia University from 1930 to 1932. Between 1930 and 1934, he played professional baseball in the Negro leagues for the Cuban Stars (East) and Pollock's Cuban Stars. Rivero went on to hold a variety of coaching positions at Lincoln University in Pennsylvania from 1933 to 1977. The school's home gymnasium, Manuel Rivero Hall, is named in his honor. Rivero died in Rising Sun, Maryland in 2001 at age 92.

Head coaching record

Football

References

External links
 and Seamheads

1908 births
2001 deaths
College tennis coaches in the United States
College track and field coaches in the United States
Columbia Lions football players
Columbia Lions baseball players
Cuban Stars (East) players
Lincoln Lions athletic directors
Lincoln Lions baseball coaches
Lincoln Lions football coaches
Lincoln Lions men's basketball coaches
Pollock's Cuban Stars players
Sportspeople from Havana
20th-century African-American sportspeople